Tanvi Dogra is an Indian television actress best known for portraying Falguni Purohit in Jiji Maa. She is currently portraying Neetii Juneja in Colors TV's show Parineetii.

Career

Dogra started her career by portraying  Babita Sharma in Zee TV's Meri Saasu Maa in 2016.

She received recognition through Star Bharat's Jiji Maa which ran from 2017 to 2019 where she played the protagonist Falguni Purohit Rawat.

In 2019, she portrayed Kavya Singhania Mittal in the revenge thriller Ek Bhram Sarvagun Sampanna on Star Plus but quit the series midway.

From 2020 to 2021, she portrayed dual role as Swati Mishra Singh and Babli in &TV's Santoshi Maa.

Since 2022, she is portraying  Neetii Juneja in Colors TV's Parineetii alongside Anchal Sahu and Ankur Verma.

Filmography

Television

Special appearances

References 

Year of birth missing (living people)
Living people
Actresses in Hindi television
Indian television actresses